Miodytiscus hirtipes is a species of beetle in the family Dytiscidae, the only species in the genus Miodytiscus.

References

Dytiscidae